Anoxycalyx joubini is a species of  Antarctic sponge. The species may have an extremely long lifespan, with estimates of up to 15,000 years. A. joubini occurs in deeper waters than the similar species Cinachyra antarctica, which is also very long-lived. This may slow down their growth rate and other biological processes because one caught specimen of A. joubini, did not show any growth in a span of 10 years.

References

Hexactinellida
Animals described in 1916
Marine fauna of Antarctica